Derik John Baker (born January 31, 1990), known as Virginia To Vegas,  is an American-born Canadian musician, singer and songwriter. He is based in Toronto, Ontario. He is best known for his gold and platinum-certified singles, "We Are Stars", "Lights Out", "Selfish", "Just Friends" and "Betterman", released through Wax Records and Ultra Records.

Beginnings
Although Derik John Baker was born in the United States, he was raised in Guelph and Toronto, Ontario, where he attended high school at Guelph Collegiate Vocational Institute. After high school, Derik attended Sheridan College for studies in Travel and Tourism.

Career

2013–2014: Career beginnings and Vol. I
Virginia To Vegas was signed to an independent full service 100% Canadian music company Wax Records in July 2013, after label executive, Jamie Appleby, discovered him on YouTube. The first single "We Are Stars" was released on January 7, 2014, and entered the Canadian Singles Top 100 chart at 94 on week 5, February 1, 2014, peaked at 14 and stayed for one week. On November 10, 2014, Virginia to Vegas released his debut EP Vol. I, which includes his Platinum-certified debut single "We Are Stars".

2015–2016: Utopian
Virginia to Vegas released a new single, "Our Story", on May 4, 2015. On September 2, 2016, he released a new single, "Lights Out", which samples Rockwell's 1984 single, "Somebody's Watching Me". That fall, he announced that his debut studio album would be released by the end of 2016. Utopian was released on December 2, 2016 and features all four of his singles released through that date. This was when he first got signed to a U.S record company of Ultra Records.

2017–2019: Hartland St.
On February 24, 2017, Virginia To Vegas released a new single called "Selfish". On November 8, he released another single called "Emotions". His next single "Yesterday" was released on October 12, 2018. Finally, he released "Just Friends" on May 24, 2019. All these songs are featured on his second EP Hartland St., which was released on June 14, 2019. Hartland Street is the name of the actual street he lives on in real life. This was when he moved to, was living in, and was leaving Los Angeles at a time.

2020–present: A Constant State of Improvement and Don't Wake Me, I'm Dreaming
Only months after the release of Hartland St., Virginia To Vegas released the single "Betterman" on February 14, 2020, followed by an EP titled A Constant State of Improvement on February 28, 2020, which includes the song "Betterman". On October 30, 2020, he released another EP, Don't Wake Me, I'm Dreaming, which includes the lead single "Palm Springs (The Way You Made Me Feel)", released on September 18. In September 2021, he collaborated with MacKenzie Porter on the single "This Sucks.".

Discography

Studio albums

Extended plays

Compilation extended plays

Singles

As lead artist

As featured artist

Promotional singles

Awards
Virginia to Vegas performed at the 2014 Canadian Radio Music Awards where he was nominated for the Heartseeker Award. His radio success with his first three singles "We Are Stars", "Don't Fight the Music", and "Our Story" contributed to him being nominated for Pop Artist or Group of the Year at the 2015 Sirius XM Indie Awards.

"We Are Stars", "Lights Out" and "Selfish" all earned Virginia to Vegas Socan awards for pop recordings of the year.

In 2015 Virginia to Vegas was awarded at the Canadian Radio Music Awards for the Factor Breakthrough Artist of the Year.

He received a Juno Award nomination for Breakthrough Artist of the Year at the Juno Awards of 2018.

References

External links
 Billboard Artist Page
 

1990 births
Living people
21st-century American male singers
21st-century American singers
21st-century Canadian male singers
American emigrants to Canada
American expatriates in Canada
American male pop singers
American male singer-songwriters
American pop rock singers
Canadian male singers
Canadian male singer-songwriters
Canadian pop singers
Musicians from Guelph